Meteli is a rural locality (a settlement) in Beloglazovsky Selsoviet, Shipunovsky District, Altai Krai, Russia. The population was 294 as of 2013. There are 4 streets.

Geography 
Meteli is located 28 km southeast of Shipunovo (the district's administrative centre) by road. Bestuzhevo is the nearest rural locality.

References 

Rural localities in Shipunovsky District